Events from the year 1619 in Denmark.

Incumbents
 Monarch – Christian IV

Events

 19 February  Ove Gjedde captures two French privateers off Cape Verde.
 6 April – A royal decree states that everybody who builds a "good house" in Christianshavn will get a deed on the lots and several years of tax discounts.
 9 May – King Christian IV sends out an expedition led by Jens Munk to find the North-West Passage. On board is also Rasmus Jensen, the first Lutheran cleric in Canada. 
 5 September – Church of Holmen is inaugurated in the former naval anchor forge in Copenhagen.

Undated
 An outbreak of plague hits Copenhagen, killing 7,000 people in the period 1619-20.
 Reinhold Timm is engaged as drawing teacher at Aorø Academy.

Births
 21 January – Anders Bording, poet and journalist (died 1677)
 17 April – Birgitte Thott, translator, writer and feminist (died 1662)
 20 September – Sophie Elisabeth Pentz, countess (died 1657)
Full date unknown
 Anne Palles, alleged witch (died 1693)

Deaths
 19 August – Jørgen Lunge, Rigsmarsk (born 1677)
 November – Jonas Charisius, physician, politician, and ambassador (born 1571)
Full date unknown
 Lorenz van Steenwinckel, architect (born 1585)

References

 
Denmark
Years of the 17th century in Denmark